Rocky Smith (born October 24, 1954) is an American retired professional basketball player.

High school
Born in Oroville, California, Smith graduated from Oroville High School, where he played basketball, in 1973.  He was an All-Star, all four years that he played for the Tigers.

College career
Smith started his college basketball career at Butte Community College, where he played from 1973 to 1975. He then played college basketball at Oregon State University, with the Beavers, where he was named first-team All-Pac-8 Conference in 1977. Smith led the Beavers in scoring in his final two seasons.

Professional career
After his college career, Smith was selected in the 4th round, number 84 overall, by the Houston Rockets, in the 1977 NBA draft. Smith went on to play professional basketball in Australia, where he played with the St. Kilda Saints, in the National Basketball League. While with the Saints, he was voted the NBL Most Valuable Player in 1980, and was also named the NBL Grand Final MVP in that same year. The following season, he was named to the All-NBL First Team.

He also played one season in the Continental Basketball Association (CBA), with the Wyoming Wildcatters, in the 1982–83 season. During that season, he averaged 7.3 points per game.

Smith also played in Brazil, being the country's highest paid basketball player in the 80's. In Brazil, he played with some of the most traditional Brazilian basketball teams, such as: C.A. Monte Líbano, in the 1981–82 season, S.C. Corinthians Paulista, from 1983 until 1987, Limeira, in 1987–88, Flamengo, in 1988–90, and Franca, in 1990–91.

References

External links
Latinbasket.com Profile
NBL Australia Stats

1954 births
Living people
American expatriate basketball people in Australia
American expatriate basketball people in Brazil
American men's basketball players
Basketball players from California
Butte College alumni
Clube Atlético Monte Líbano basketball players
Flamengo basketball players
Franca Basquetebol Clube players
Houston Rockets draft picks
Junior college men's basketball players in the United States
Oregon State Beavers men's basketball players
Sportspeople from Oroville, California
Shooting guards
Southern Melbourne Saints players
Sport Club Corinthians Paulista basketball players
Wyoming Wildcatters players